Nick Lars Heidfeld (born 10 May 1977) is a German professional racing driver.

Heidfeld currently holds two Formula One records; most podium finishes without a Grand Prix win (13), and the most second-place finishes without a win (8).

In 2011, Heidfeld raced in Formula One for the Renault team as a replacement for the injured Robert Kubica, his former BMW Sauber teammate, before being replaced by Bruno Senna. He last drove for the Rebellion Racing team in the FIA World Endurance Championship and for Mahindra Racing Formula E Team in Formula E.

Early life and career

Heidfeld was born in Mönchengladbach, West Germany on 10 May 1977, and began racing karts at the age of 11 in 1988. In 1994 he moved into the German Formula Ford series, gaining widespread attention by winning 8 of the 9 races to take the title that season. In 1995 he won the German International Formula Ford 1800 Championship, and came second in the Zetec Cup. This led to a drive in the German Formula Three Championship for 1996, where he finished third overall, after taking 3 wins. He entered the end of the season Macau Grand Prix and won the first heat of the race, attracting the attention of compatriot Norbert Haug, who later signed him up for the West Competition team.

Junior career
The following year Heidfeld won the German F3 Championship for Bertram Schäfer Racing, with support from McLaren/West, including a win at the Monaco Grand Prix Formula Three support race. In 1998, he won three races and was runner-up in the International Formula 3000 championship, with the West Competition team. At the final race of the season he was demoted to the back of the grid from pole position, after his team used non-compliant fuel. He finished the race ninth and out of the points, losing the championship by seven points to Juan Pablo Montoya. During that season, he was also the official test driver for the McLaren-Mercedes Formula One team. In 1999, he won the International Formula 3000 Championship. That year he also took the official track record at the Goodwood Festival of Speed which stood for 20 years. He was also a member of the Mercedes squad that raced at the 1999 24 Hours of Le Mans, but the team withdrew after the Mercedes-Benz CLR back-flipped on the Mulsanne Straight while Mark Webber and Peter Dumbreck were driving.

Formula One career

Prost (2000)
Heidfeld was signed as a race driver for the Prost Grand Prix F1 team for the 2000 season, alongside Formula One veteran Jean Alesi. Heidfeld struggled with his new car and suffered a string of retirements, as well as colliding with his teammate on more than one occasion.

Sauber (2001–2003)
He departed Prost at the end of that season, before signing a three-year contract with Sauber for 2001. He was partnered with then rookie driver Kimi Räikkönen. Heidfeld scored his first podium with a third-place finish in the Brazilian Grand Prix. After the announcement of Mika Häkkinen's retirement, many thought that Heidfeld would replace him in the McLaren-Mercedes team, as he had Mercedes backing and had outscored the much more inexperienced Räikkönen by three points over the year. However, the McLaren seat went to Räikkönen, and Heidfeld stayed with Sauber for 2002 and 2003, where he racked up a number of points finishes. In 2002 he outperformed another rookie teammate, Felipe Massa, but was then beaten by his more experienced fellow countryman, Heinz-Harald Frentzen, in 2003.

Jordan (2004)
At the end of the 2003 season, Heidfeld was replaced at the Sauber team by Jordan's Giancarlo Fisichella and looked to be without a race seat for the 2004 season. However, after impressing during a series of preseason tests, it was announced that Heidfeld would race with the financially strapped Jordan team, alongside rookie Giorgio Pantano. The EJ14 was an upgrade of the previous season's uncompetitive EJ13 and proved slow. Despite this, Heidfeld often outperformed the car, finishing ahead of more competitive vehicles. He finished seventh at the Monaco Grand Prix and eighth at the Canadian Grand Prix and finished the season with three points.

Williams (2005)

During the winter of 2004–2005, Heidfeld tested with the Williams team, in a 'shootout' against Antônio Pizzonia for the second race seat alongside Mark Webber. At the Williams launch on 31 January 2005, it was announced that Heidfeld would be the race driver for the team in 2005, replacing the McLaren-bound Juan Pablo Montoya.

He performed well throughout the season, often finishing ahead of teammate Webber. At the seventh race of the 2005 season at the Nürburgring circuit, his home Grand Prix, Heidfeld took his first and only pole position. In Monaco he finished second, which he equalled at the Nürburgring in the same season.

Heidfeld missed the Italian and Belgian Grands Prix due to injuries suffered in a testing accident. Scheduled to come back for Brazil, he was injured again when hit by a motorbike when out cycling, and therefore forced to sit out the rest of the season.

BMW Sauber (2006–2009)

2006
Heidfeld gained a contract with his then Williams' engine supplier, BMW, when they bought the Sauber team (BMW and Sauber merger) and entered Formula One as BMW Sauber for the 2006 season, replacing Felipe Massa who was bound for Ferrari.

During 2006 Heidfeld scored points several times for his new team. At Melbourne he ran as high as second until the safety car came out. He eventually finished fourth. At Indianapolis, he was eliminated in a spectacular first lap accident which saw fellow drivers Scott Speed, Jenson Button, Kimi Räikkönen and Juan Pablo Montoya also go out. Heidfeld's car was launched into a quadruple barrel roll, but he and the other drivers all walked away unharmed. The Hungarian Grand Prix saw Heidfeld give BMW Sauber their first podium finish and best result of the year, when he finished third, even though he had only qualified tenth on the grid.

At the end of 2006, Heidfeld was quoted attacking the media's saturation coverage of his teammate Robert Kubica, who had scored fewer points than him. This has happened two other times in the German's career; in 2001 when he was teammates with Kimi Räikkönen (whom he beat twelve points to nine) and in 2002, when he was teammates with Felipe Massa (whom he beat by seven points to four). Räikkönen and Massa later formed the 2007 Ferrari driver line-up.

2007

Heidfeld started the 2007 season strongly. In Bahrain, he chased down and overtook reigning world champion Fernando Alonso around the outside, finishing half a minute ahead of his BMW teammate Kubica. He scored three fourth places in the opening three races, a sixth in Monaco, and a second place at the Canadian Grand Prix, where he also out-qualified both Ferraris, equalling his best ever Grand Prix finish. After retiring from fifth place at Indianapolis, he was outscored by teammate Kubica at both Magny-Cours and Silverstone. At an eventful European Grand Prix at the Nürburgring, Heidfeld's home circuit, where he collided with Kubica on the opening lap, he recovered and overtook Kubica on the final lap to finish sixth, despite making six pitstops during the race. Heidfeld returned to form in Hungary, qualifying second and finishing third to score his and BMW's second podium of the season. He finished fourth at the Turkish and Italian Grand Prix, and fifth in the Belgian Grand Prix. He eventually finished a career-best fifth in the championship with 61 points, outpointing Kubica by 22 points.

On 28 April 2007, Heidfeld drove three demonstration laps around the Nürburgring's legendary 14 mile Nordschleife track, which made him the first driver in 31 years to pilot a current F1 car there. About 45,000 spectators attended the event, which was held after a four-hour VLN endurance race.

2008

Heidfeld began the 2008 season strongly, finishing second in Australia after qualifying fifth. In Malaysia, he qualified fifth but dropped down to tenth at the first corner after being pushed wide by Jarno Trulli. He got back up to sixth, also setting his first ever fastest lap in the process. In Bahrain he started from sixth place but he did not gain a place at the start, but passed Trulli and Heikki Kovalainen to climb up to fourth. He finished there and this fourth gave him second in the championship.

After a few disappointing qualifying sessions and races in the following weeks (after which the German press started to call him "Leidfeld", with "Leid" meaning "misery" in German), Kubica and Heidfeld made BMW Sauber history by securing the third-year team's first victory, and first one-two finish respectively in Canada. Heidfeld was positioned eighth on the grid and after losing a place at the start, before gaining it back, was sitting comfortably in eighth place once again before a safety car situation saw the top 7 cars enter the pits in what was to soon become a bizarre series of errors that left Heidfeld and Kubica battling for the top two places. Heidfeld was switched to a one-stop fuel strategy and came out of his stop ahead of Kubica, but considerably heavier on fuel. Not long afterwards, Heidfeld moved off the racing line allowing Kubica to make an easy pass, which then allowed the lighter BMW Sauber to build up a considerable lead on Heidfeld, who was occupied with preventing Fernando Alonso, also in a lighter car, from chasing Kubica. The gap built by Kubica allowed him to rejoin the race comfortably in the lead after his final pitstop with no threats behind him. Heidfeld finished the race second, solidifying his fifth-place position in the driver's points although his post-race body language suggested he was unhappy to have ceded a potential win for the benefit of the team. Heidfeld had a disappointing race in France, failing to score any points. He came back strongly at the British Grand Prix, starting fifth and finishing second in the wet conditions. Another strong performance, where he set the fastest lap of the race for the second time this season, was his home grand prix at the Hockenheimring showed that, for the time being, he had reversed the performance deficit to his teammate. Another second-place finish at the Belgian Grand Prix, followed by 5th and 6th-place finishes in Italy and Singapore respectively put him just one point behind current World Champion Kimi Räikkönen with just three races remaining.

It was confirmed on 6 October that both Heidfeld and teammate Kubica would remain at the BMW Sauber team for the  season.

In the last three races Heidfeld scored four points, ending in sixth place in the standings after being passed by Fernando Alonso at the last round of the season. However, Heidfeld became only the second driver to finish 18 races in a single season, after Tiago Monteiro completed the same feat with Jordan in 2005. Heidfeld also became the first driver to finish every single race in a season since Michael Schumacher in 2002.

2009

Heidfeld began  in Australia by qualifying in 11th place and finishing 10th in the race. At the Malaysian Grand Prix, Heidfeld again qualified in 11th, but started 10th as Sebastian Vettel was issued a 10 place drop (for an incident caused in Australia with Heidfeld's teammate Kubica). The race was stopped due to torrential rain on the 33rd lap, when Heidfeld was third, but as set out in the regulations, the result was taken at the end of the penultimate completed lap, when Heidfeld had been running second. Because less than 75% of the race distance had been covered, the drivers only received half points. A seventh-place finish at Monza added a further 2 points to his 2009 tally. Nevertheless, four points-scoring finishes in the final six races secured him thirteenth position in the Drivers' Championship, two points ahead of Kubica.

In Singapore, Heidfeld's run of 41 consecutive classified finishes was brought to an end due to a collision with Force India's Adrian Sutil.

2010: Different stints

Mercedes and Pirelli test driver
Following BMW's decision to withdraw from the sport at the end of the 2009 season, Heidfeld's future in Formula One was uncertain. It was mentioned that he was considered to drive for Mercedes GP alongside fellow German Nico Rosberg but the team signed another German in Michael Schumacher instead. McLaren was also a potential destination however these negotiations came to nothing as well. Heidfeld was then tipped for a seat at Sauber alongside Kamui Kobayashi but they decided to go with Pedro de la Rosa. Heidfeld was then in the running for a Renault seat alongside fellow BMW Sauber refugee Robert Kubica, but on 4 February, Heidfeld was confirmed as the test and reserve driver for Mercedes.

At the Australian Grand Prix, Heidfeld was chosen to succeed Pedro de la Rosa as Chairman of the Grand Prix Drivers' Association. He left the position upon taking the role of Pirelli's test driver ahead of the Belgian Grand Prix, and was replaced by Rubens Barrichello.

In August 2010, with Heidfeld not yet having driven the Mercedes MGP W01 car, the team released him from his contract so that he could become the Pirelli tyre company's test driver. Heidfeld completed three tests for Pirelli in Mugello, Paul Ricard and Jerez before being released from his duties to join Sauber, with his place being taken by Romain Grosjean.

Returns to F1 with Sauber (2010)

In September 2010, Heidfeld returned to the Formula One grid, replacing Pedro de la Rosa at the Sauber team for the remainder of the 2010 season. This marked his third spell with them. On 4 October 2010, Sauber confirmed their driver line-up for 2011 as Kamui Kobayashi and Sergio Pérez, seemingly leaving Heidfeld without a drive for 2011, before replacing Robert Kubica at Renault, who was injured in a rally accident on 6 February 2011.

Lotus Renault (2011)

On 9 February, Lotus Renault GP confirmed that Heidfeld would be sharing testing duties with Bruno Senna on the Saturday and Sunday of the four-day test at Jerez, to evaluate the drivers in preparation of replacing the injured and former BMW Sauber teammate Robert Kubica, who had suffered long-term injuries to his arm and hand in a crash whilst rallying in Italy, for the  season. On the Saturday, Heidfeld set the quickest time of the day, stating that he enjoyed his day's running – 86 laps – with the team, and had fun driving the car. Heidfeld was confirmed as Kubica's replacement on 16 February 2011. He added another 12th place in China, before a seventh-place finish in Turkey after a close battle with teammate Petrov. He was forced to retire after his car caught fire after exiting the pit lane on lap 25 in the Hungarian Grand Prix. Heidfeld officially parted company with the team on 2 September 2011.

Legacy
In 2016, in an academic paper that reported a mathematical modeling study that assessed the relative influence of driver and machine, Heidfeld was ranked the 23rd best Formula One driver of all time.

Endurance racing
On 1 February 2012, it was confirmed that Heidfeld would join the Rebellion Racing team to contest both the Le Mans 24 Hours and selected races of the FIA World Endurance Championship. In addition to Le Mans, he also raced at the Sebring 12 Hours and Spa 6 Hours, sharing a Lola-Toyota LMP1 car with teammates Neel Jani and Nicolas Prost. The car finished 32nd overall and seventh in class at Sebring after encountering problems, before leading home a Rebellion one-two in the unofficial privateer class at Spa, finishing fifth overall behind the four works Audis. At Le Mans, Heidfeld and his teammates went one better by finishing fourth, splitting the Audis after a fast and problem-free run.

Formula E

On 26 June 2014, Heidfeld signed up for the inaugural season of Formula E for Venturi Grand Prix. In the first race at the 2014 Beijing ePrix, he had a spectacular accident at the final corner on the final lap with e.Dams Renault driver Nicolas Prost whilst fighting for the lead. Prost later accepted the blame for the accident. At the 2014 Putrajaya ePrix, he retired from the race after a collision this time with Franck Montagny but to add insult to injury, he was excluded from the 19th position finish for changing his car outside the permitted area during his pit stop, meaning he cannot count the race as a round where he drops a score.

Personal life
Heidfeld lives in Stäfa, Switzerland with his fiancée, daughter (born 2005), and sons (born 2007, 2010). He has an elder brother, Tim, and a younger brother, Sven, a former racing driver who is now a motorsport commentator for German television.

His nickname to Formula One fans is "Quick Nick", which he got while driving for Williams in 2005.

Racing record

Career summary

† As Heidfeld was a guest driver, he was ineligible to score points.

Formula racing

International Formula 3000 results
(key) (Races in bold indicate pole position; races in italics indicate fastest lap)

Formula One results
(key) (Races in bold indicate pole position; races in italics indicate fastest lap)

 Did not finish, but was classified as he had completed more than 90% of the race distance.
‡ Half points awarded as less than 75% of race distance was completed.

Formula One records
Heidfeld holds the following Formula One records:

Formula E results
(key) (Races in bold indicate pole position; races in italics indicate fastest lap)

Formula E records
Heidfeld co-holds the following Formula E record:

Endurance racing

Le Mans 24 Hours results

FIA World Endurance Championship results

American Le Mans Series results

WeatherTech SportsCar Championship results

References

External links

  
 
 Nick Heidfeld 1st official Fanclub website 

1977 births
Living people
Sportspeople from Mönchengladbach
German expatriate sportspeople in Monaco
German expatriate sportspeople in Switzerland
Expatriate sportspeople in Monaco
Racing drivers from North Rhine-Westphalia
German racing drivers
German Formula Three Championship drivers
International Formula 3000 drivers
International Formula 3000 Champions
German Formula One drivers
Prost Formula One drivers
Sauber Formula One drivers
Jordan Formula One drivers
Williams Formula One drivers
Renault Formula One drivers
24 Hours of Le Mans drivers
Porsche Supercup drivers
Supercars Championship drivers
American Le Mans Series drivers
FIA World Endurance Championship drivers
Formula E drivers
People from Stäfa
Eifelland Racing drivers
Opel Team BSR drivers
Mercedes-AMG Motorsport drivers
Rebellion Racing drivers
Venturi Grand Prix drivers
Mahindra Racing drivers
Nürburgring 24 Hours drivers
WeatherTech SportsCar Championship drivers
Campos Racing drivers
West Competition drivers
World Rallycross Championship drivers